Plotly is a technical computing company headquartered in Montreal, Quebec, that develops online data analytics and visualization tools. Plotly provides online graphing, analytics, and statistics tools for individuals and collaboration, as well as scientific graphing libraries for Python, R, MATLAB, Perl, Julia, Arduino, and REST.

History 
Plotly was founded by Alex Johnson, Jack Parmer, Chris Parmer, and Matthew Sundquist.

The founders' backgrounds are in science, energy, and data analysis and visualization. Early employees include Christophe Viau, a Canadian software engineer and Ben Postlethwaite, a Canadian geophysicist. Plotly was named one of the Top 20 Hottest Innovative Companies in Canada by the Canadian Innovation Exchange. Plotly was featured in "startup row" at PyCon 2013, and sponsored the SciPy 2018 conference.

Plotly raised $5.5 million during its Series A funding, led by MHS Capital, Siemens Venture Capital, Rho Ventures, Real Ventures, and Silicon Valley Bank.

The Boston Globe and Washington Post newsrooms have produced data journalism using Plotly. In 2020, Plotly was named a Best Place to Work by the Canadian SME National Business Awards, and nominated as Business of the Year.

Products 
Plotly offers open-source and enterprise products.
Dash is an open-source Python, R, and Julia framework for building web-based analytic applications. Many specialized open-source Dash libraries exist that are tailored for building domain-specific Dash components and applications. Some examples are Dash DAQ, for building data acquisition GUIs to use with scientific instruments, and Dash Bio, which enables users to build custom chart types, sequence analysis tools, and 3D rendering tools for bioinformatics applications.
Dash Enterprise is Plotly’s paid product for building, testing, deploying, managing and scaling Dash applications organization-wide.
Chart Studio Cloud is a free, online tool for creating interactive graphs. It has a point-and-click graphical user interface for importing and analyzing data into a grid and using stats tools. Graphs can be embedded or downloaded.
Chart Studio Enterprise is a paid product that allows teams to create, style, and share interactive graphs on a single platform. It offers expanded authentication and file export options, and does not limit sharing and viewing.
Data visualization libraries Plotly.js is an open-source JavaScript library for creating graphs and powers Plotly.py for Python, as well as Plotly.R for R, MATLAB, Node.js, Julia, and Arduino and a REST API. Plotly can also be used to style interactive graphs with Jupyter notebook.
Figure Converters which convert matplotlib, ggplot2, and IGOR Pro graphs into interactive, online graphs.

Data visualization libraries
Plotly provides a collection of supported chart types across several programming languages:

Dash
Dash is a Python framework built on top of React, a JavaScript library. But Dash also works for R, and most recently supports Julia, and while still described a Python framework, Python isn't used for the other languages, "describing Dash as a Python framework misses a key feature of its design: the Python side (the back end/server) of Dash was built to be lightweight and stateless [allowing] multiple back-end languages to coexist on an equal footing". It is possible to integrate D3.js charts as Dash components. Dash provides the default CSS (and HTML and JavaScript, and you can add your own), but for custom styling Dash applications CSS can be added, or Dash Enterprise used.

Dash Enterprise
Dash Enterprise is Plotly’s paid product for building, testing, deploying, managing and scaling Dash applications organization-wide. The product integrates with enterprise IT systems to enable organizations to build, deploy and scale low-code Dash applications. With open-source Dash, analytic applications can be run from a local machine, but cannot be easily accessed by others in the organization.

Enterprise IT integration
Dash Enterprise installs on cloud environments and on-premises. Amazon Web Services, Google Cloud Platform, and Microsoft Azure are supported, as are multiple Linux on-premises servers.
Authentication integrations include LDAP, AD, PKI, Okta, SAML, OAuth2, SSO, and email authentication, and Dash application access is managed through a GUI rather than code.
Dash Enterprise connects to major big data backends, including Salesforce, PostgreSQL, Databricks via PySpark, Snowflake, Dask, Datashader, and Vaex. In 2020, Plotly partnered with NVIDIA to integrate Dash with RAPIDS, and NVIDIA participated in Plotly’s Series C funding round.

Low-code capabilities
Dash Enterprise enables low-code development of Dash applications, which is not possible with open-source Dash. Enterprise users can write applications in multiple development environments, including Jupyter Notebook. Dash Enterprise ships with several “development engines” for drag-and-drop application editing, application design, and automated reporting, as well as dozens of artificial intelligence and machine learning application templates.

Deployment and scaling
Dash application code is deployed to Dash Enterprise using the git-push command. Dash application deployments are containerized to avoid dependency conflicts, and can be embedded in existing web platforms without iframes.
Deployed applications can be managed and accessed in a single portal called App Manager, where administrators can control user authentication and view usage analytics.
Dash Enterprise scales horizontally with Kubernetes. Jobs queuing, GPU acceleration, and CPU parallelization support high performance computing requirements. 
Plotly also offers professional services for application development and workshop training.

References

External links

Business intelligence companies
Business software
Business software companies
Companies based in Montreal
JavaScript
Data management software
Data visualization software
Free data visualization software
Plotting
Plotting
Plotting
JavaScript libraries
JavaScript visualization toolkits
Productivity software
Plotting software
Time series software
Visualization API